Adan Haji Ali Ahmed is a Somaliland lawyer and judge, serving as the current Chief Justice of Somaliland. He assumed the position on June 3, 2015, when he was appointed by Ahmed Mohamed Mohamoud.

See also
Ministry of Justice (Somaliland)
Supreme Court of Somaliland

References

Chief justices of Somaliland
Issa Musa
Living people
People from Hargeisa
Somaliland lawyers
Year of birth missing (living people)